Alex Lehtinen (born 9 April 1996) is a Finnish-Swiss footballer who plays as a defender for IF Gnistan.

International career
Lehtinen has played at international level for Finland from under-15 to under-20 level, but was called up by Switzerland's under-18 set up in 2014. He played once, in a friendly against Italy.

Career statistics

Notes

Personal life 
A dual citizen of Finland and Switzerland, Lehtinen was born to a Finnish father and Swiss mother in Finland, where he has lived most of his life. His father, Kalle Lehtinen, is a former footballer.

References

External links
 Alex Lehtinen at football.ch

1996 births
Living people
Finnish footballers
Association football defenders
FC Honka players
Klubi 04 players
Helsingin Jalkapalloklubi players
IF Gnistan players
Veikkausliiga players
Kakkonen players
Footballers from Helsinki
Finnish people of Swiss descent
Butler Bulldogs men's soccer players
Swiss people of Finnish descent